Sisto can refer to:
 San Sisto, "Saint Sixtus", dedication of several Italian churches
 Sisto, character on The Brak Show
 Jeremy Sisto, American actor
 José Sisto, Spanish politician, Governor of Guam
 Meadow Sisto, American actress
 Pione Sisto, Ugandan-born Danish footballer of South Sudanese origin
 Rocco Sisto, Italian actor